Daedeok Innopolis, formerly known as Daedeok Science Town, is the research and development district in the Yuseong-gu district in Daejeon, South Korea. The plan to concentrate research institutes and universities was made in 1967, and president Park Chunghee approved subsequent master planning in 1973.  Now the district contains over 20 major research institutes and over 40 corporate research centers. There are 232 research and educational institutions to be found in Daejeon, many in the Daedeok region, among them the Electronics and Telecommunications Research Institute and the Korea Aerospace Research Institute. A number of IT venture companies have sprung up in this region thanks to the high concentration of Ph.Ds in the applied sciences. Korea has invested heavily in building up the research expertise for over 30 years, creating long-term research programs. Over 7,000 PhD researchers are in the sciences in Daedeok and it had the most application for patents during 2000–2011 among the National Industrial Complex.

The "town" will provide a core for the International Science and Business Belt.

The Daedeok Innopolis logo was created by the industrial design company INNO Design in Palo Alto, USA.

Institutes

Government agencies

Agency for Defense Development
Central Branch Office (중부분소), National Forensic Service
Central Research Institute (중앙연구원), Korea Hydro & Nuclear Power
Electric Power Research Institute (전력연구원), Korea Electric Power Corporation
Electronics and Telecommunications Research Institute
 Institute for Basic Science
International Intellectual Property Training Institute
KAIST
Korea Aerospace Research Institute
Korea Astronomy and Space Science Institute
Korea Atomic Energy Research Institute
Korea Basic Science Institute
Korea Evaluation Institute of Industrial Technology
Korea Institute of Energy Research
Korea Institute of Geoscience and Mineral Resources
Korea Institute of Machinery & Materials
Korea Institute of Nuclear Nonproliferation and Control
Korea Institute of Nuclear Safety
Korea Institute of Ocean Science and Technology
Korea Institute of Oriental Medicine
Korea Institute of R&D Human Resource Development
Korea Institute of Science and Technology Information
Korea Institute of Toxicology
Korea Research Institute of Bioscience and Biotechnology
Korea Research Institute of Chemical Technology
Korea Research Institute of Standards and Science
Korea Institute of Fusion Energy (KFE) (hosts KSTAR)
National Institute for Mathematical Sciences
National NanoFab Center
National Research Foundation of Korea
National Research Institute of Cultural Heritage
National Security Research Institute
National Urban Research Institute (국토도시연구원), Korea Land and Housing Corporation
Occupational Safety and Health Research Institute
Reactor Design Division (원자로설계사업본부), KEPCO E&C
Research Institute of Water Resources (수자원연구원), K-water
Ship & Offshore Plant Research Institute (선박해양플랜트연구소, KRISO), Korea Institute of Ocean Science and Technology

Public enterprises
KEPCO Research Institute (전력연구원)
Korea Minting and Security Printing Corporation
Korea Nuclear Fuel
National Urban Research Institute (국토도시연구원), Korea Land and Housing Corporation
Research Institute of Water Resources (수자원연구원), K-water

Other science and culture facilities

Museums 
Currency Museum of Korea, Daejeon
Geological Museum
National Science Museum

Parks 
Expo Science Park

References

External links 
English website

Universities and colleges in Daejeon
Buildings and structures in Daejeon
Science parks in South Korea